Lisa Kelly (born 7 May 1977) is an Irish singer of both classical and Celtic music and a voice teacher. She has taken part in many musical theatre productions and concerts, and is a founding and former member of the musical group Celtic Woman.

Early life 
Lisa Kelly was born in Dublin, into a musical family, with both her parents, Joe and Noeleen Kelly, and sisters, Joanne and Helen Kelly, being singers. Lisa herself has been singing since the age of seven, when she starred in the musical version of Bugsy Malone. Her parents are both heavily involved in amateur theatre, influencing Lisa toward studying drama, as well as being classically trained in both piano and singing.

Career 
She has played several principal roles, such as "Velma Kelly" in Chicago, "Florence" in Chess, "Laurey" in Oklahoma!, "Maria" in West Side Story and "Sandy" in Grease.

She has also performed in a number of concerts in Dublin's National Concert Hall, including The Magic of Gershwin, The Music of Cole Porter and From Romberg to Rodgers, and has won numerous national awards for singing and drama.

Riverdance 
After deciding to take a break from her day job in the computer industry to return to theatre, she played the lead role in the Christmas pantomime Jack and the Beanstalk at Dublin's Gaiety Theatre. This led to her being cast in the American production of Riverdance – The Show as lead female vocalist in 2000, a position she held for five years while touring. While touring with Riverdance, Kelly met Australian dancer Scott Porter, who later became her husband. During this time, Kelly also met fellow vocalist Lynn Hilary, who would later go on to become a member of Celtic Woman in 2007 as a replacement for Méav Ní Mhaolchatha.

Kelly was one of the Riverdance vocalists who appeared in the 2003 Special Olympics opening ceremony when they performed "Cloudsong". This was in support of Lynn Hilary, who had the leading vocal role at the start of the song.

Solo album 
In 2002, Kelly was asked to record a solo album with director David Downes on the Celtic Collections label. The resulting album, Lisa, was released in 2003. Songs on this CD are "Carrickfergus", "Siúil A Rún", "The Deer's Cry", "Lift the Wings", "The Soft Goodbye", "Home and the Heartland", "Homecoming", "Now We Are Free", "Dubhdarra", "May It Be" and "Send Me a Song".

Celtic Woman 
Kelly was again approached by Downes in 2004, and asked to be part of Celtic Woman, originally planned as a one-night event at Dublin's Helix Theatre. The group has since released several albums and DVD performances of their concerts and embarked on several world tours.

She says she accepted a spot in Celtic Woman because "I wasn't doing anything else that day." She did not know any of the artists she would be performing with when they first got together but Kelly stated that "the show is blessed with the girls [the show's creators] picked." She has toured with Celtic Woman throughout most of their tours and appears in almost every CD and DVD to date.

Kelly performs several songs with Celtic Woman. She sings "Send Me a Song" and "The Blessing", both originals that have been featured on the original and A New Journey CDs, DVDs, and tours respectively. They were written by David Downes and feature him on the piano. Another song written by David Downes is "Green the Whole Year Round", which has been featured on the Christmas Celebration DVD and Greatest Journey CD and DVD, but not any tour. Kelly performed "The Voice" in A New Journey, which was originally supposed to be sung by Méav Ní Mhaolchatha, and also features fiddler Máiréad Nesbitt. "The Voice" was written by Irish novelist and composer Brendan Graham. Another song that Kelly performed in the original performance is "May It Be", originally from the movie The Lord of the Rings: The Fellowship of the Ring. Kelly sang "Caledonia" in A New Journey, and sang "Fields of Gold" during the Isle of Hope and Songs From the Heart tours.  In Songs From the Heart, she also sang "The Moon's a Harsh Mistress," accompanied by Máiréad Nesbitt on the violin.

During the spring 2008 A New Journey tour, and again during the "Believe" 2012 tour, Kelly took a break for the birth of her children. She was replaced by Alex Sharpe who later became a full-time member of Celtic Woman when Orla Fallon left. In the Believe tour, her place was filled in by Susan McFadden.

Her second break from Celtic Woman was eventually announced as permanent in 2013, and McFadden became a permanent member of the group.

Other
In 2009, Kelly sang the main title song "If You Believe" for the Disney movie Tinker Bell and the Lost Treasure. Kelly was one of four people involved who were connected to Celtic Woman – the others being violinist Máiréad Nesbitt, musical director and composer David Downes, and former member and vocalist Méav Ní Mhaolchatha.

Teaching 
In January 2013, Kelly announced her second departure from Celtic Woman was permanent. Her family moved to Peachtree City, Georgia, US, where she announced the opening of The Lisa Kelly Voice Academy, indicating a switch from performing to teaching. The new voice academy is being run in conjunction with her husband Scott Porter, the former CEO of Celtic Woman Ltd. She also starred in the concert titled The Voice of Ireland, featuring fellow Celtic Woman performer Chloë Agnew and former Celtic Thunder member Paul Byrom.

On December 13, 2014, she starred in the concert titled A Celtic Christmas, featuring fellow Celtic Woman performer Chloë Agnew, former Celtic Woman choir performer Dermot Kiernan, and former Celtic Thunder member Paul Byrom, along with performances by the Kelly Porter Dance Academy.

Personal life
She is married to Australian dancer Scott Porter. They have four children: sons Cian (born 2002), Jack (born 2004) and Harry (born 2012), and daughter Ellie (born 2008). She calls them, "hands down, the most important parts of my life", and they accompany her on tour when they are not in school.

Lisa's sister Helen has performed with Celtic Woman in the choir.

Discography
 Solo
Lisa (2003; re-released 2006)
Christmas Everywhere (2014 - single)
Sending Home To You (2015 - single)

 With Celtic Woman
Celtic Woman (March 2005)
Celtic Woman: A Christmas Celebration (October 2006)
Celtic Woman: A New Journey (January 2007)
Celtic Woman: The Greatest Journey (October 2008)
Celtic Woman: Songs from the Heart (January 2010)
Celtic Woman: Lullaby (February 2011)
Celtic Woman: Believe (May 2011; January 2012)
Celtic Woman: Silent Night (2012)
Celtic Woman: The Best of Christmas (November 2017)

References

External links
 

1977 births
Living people
Celtic Woman members
Singers from Dublin (city)
Voice teachers
21st-century Irish women singers